Francis Allen may refer to:

 Francis Allen (1518/19-66/76), Member of Parliament (MP) for Boston
 Francis Allen (regicide) (c. 1583–1658), English politician and a regicide of Charles I
Francis Allen (Jesuit) (c. 1645–1712), Roman Catholic
Francis Allen (engraver) (fl. 1652), German engraver
Francis Allen (coach) (born 1948), former gymnastics coach
Francis Allen (sport shooter) (born 1961), American sports shooter
Francis B. Allen (died 1931), architect of Boston, Massachusetts

See also
Frances Allen (disambiguation) for female version of the name
Frank Allen (disambiguation)